Carol Remmer Angle is an American pediatrician, nephrologist, and toxicologist. Angle is known as one of the nation's leading researchers on lead poisoning.  She is professor emeritus at the University of Nebraska Medical Center (UNMC) in Omaha, Nebraska.  Angle joined UNMC in 1954 and was one of the first women to serve as chair of an academic medical department (pediatrics).  She also served as chief of pediatric nephrology, director of the pediatric intensive care unit, and director of medical toxicology.  In 1957, Angle along with Dr. Matilda McIntire, founded one of the country's first poison control centers.  Angle is a founding member and a prior president of the American Association of Poison Control Centers. For forty years, Angle served as an expert for NIEHS, National Institutes of Health and U.S. Environmental Protection Agency  panels investigating heavy metal toxicity. Angle continues as a toxicology consultant, reviewer and editor.

Education and training 
Angle studied English literature at Wellesley College and graduated in 1948; she later attended Cornell Medical School, and took a residency at New York Hospital Pediatric. Afterwards, she began working at the University of Nebraska Hospital, Residency

Offices held and honors 
 Director, Medical Education, Children's Memorial Hospital, Omaha, Nebraska, 1954-1967 
 Director, Nebraska Master Poison Control Center, 1957-1966 
 State Coordinator, Nebraska Master Poison Control Center, 1957-1966 
 Director, Pediatric Renal Clinic, University of Nebraska Hospital & Clinics, 1966-1984
 Director, Pediatric Intensive Care Unit, University of Nebraska Hospital, 1968-1974
 Program Chairman, American Association of Poison Control Centers, 1977-1979 
 Professor, Department of Pediatrics, University of Nebraska College of Medicine, 1971-1998 
 Director, National Foundation Birth Defects Treatment Center, Children's Memorial Hospital, 1974-1981
 Member, Toxicology Advisory Board, U.S. Consumer Product Safety Commission, 1978-1982 
 Chairman, Department of Pediatrics, University of Nebraska College of Medicine, 1981-1985
 Member, National Advisory Environmental Health Sciences Council, NIH, 1984-1987
 Director, Clinical Toxicology, University of Nebraska Medical Center, 1985-1998 
 Editor-in-Chief, Journal of Toxicology: Clinical Toxicology, 1989-2002
 Professor Emeritus, Department of Pediatrics, University of Nebraska College of Medicine, 1999–present 
 Honor Award, Matthew J. Ellenhorn Award, 2003 
 Honor Award, University of Nebraska Medical Center Legends Award, 2008

Selected works 
 
 
 
 
 
 
 
 
 
 
 
 
 
 
 
 
 
 
 
 
 
 
 
 
 
 
 
 
 
 
 
 
 Angle CR, Swanson SA:  Arsenite enhances homocysteine-induced proliferation of fibroblasts in human aortic smooth muscle cells in B12 (Cobalamin) deficient media.  Submitted to Environmental Health Perspectives, July 1997.

References 

American pediatricians
Women pediatricians
American toxicologists
Living people
1927 births
Place of birth missing (living people)
University of Nebraska Medical Center faculty
Wellesley College alumni
Weill Cornell Medical College alumni